The Northern Pacific Railway Depot in Little Falls, Minnesota, United States, is a depot designed by notable architect Cass Gilbert in 1899.  It was listed on the National Register of Historic Places in 1985.

Gilbert was a prominent architect in Minnesota, having designed the Minnesota State Capitol and other buildings.  The Little Falls depot was one of Cass Gilbert's last works before he moved east to New York City.  In 1899, the Northern Pacific Railway hired Gilbert to design a depot at a cost not exceeding $7,000.  The depot, built of sandstone, wood, and brick, mixed the Shingle Style and American Craftsman style of architecture.  The steeply pitched roof was originally covered with cedar shingles.  The depot was in use until 1979, when a fire broke out and damaged the roof and the ladies' waiting room.  A local community group acquired the building and renovated the building.  It now houses the Little Falls Chamber of Commerce.

References

External links

Buildings and structures in Morrison County, Minnesota
Railway stations in the United States opened in 1899
Railway stations on the National Register of Historic Places in Minnesota
Little Falls, Minnesota
Cass Gilbert buildings
National Register of Historic Places in Morrison County, Minnesota
American Craftsman architecture in Minnesota
Arts and Crafts architecture in the United States
Former railway stations in Minnesota
1899 establishments in Minnesota